Margaret Vines (16 January 1907 – 1 March 1997) was a British actress. She performed initially on stage, in the London West End, in the 1920s and 1930s. She then progressed into a career on screen, appearing in several films as well as TV productions.

Vines was born on 16 January, 1907, in Lourenco Marques, Portuguese East Africa. She studied at St. Andrew's School in Johannesburg. After moving to London to study at the Royal Academy of Dramatic Art she debuted as a professional actress in 1926 at the Brixton Theatre. Her Broadway debut occurred when she portrayed Anne of Bohemia in Richard of Bordeaux (1934).

Vines won a Clarence Derwent Award in 1955 as the best West End supporting actress for her work in Morning's at Seven.

Vines was marred to Edmund  Loftus-Tottenham. Following the end of that marriage, she wed Denis Gordon in 1947.

Filmography
Her films as an actress included:
 Frail Women (1932)
 Open All Night (1934)
 The Vicar of Bray (1937)

References

External links
 https://www.independent.co.uk/news/obituaries/obituary--margaret-vines-1272748.html
 https://www.imdb.com/name/nm0898940/

1907 births
1997 deaths
British stage actresses
20th-century British actresses
Alumni of RADA
British film actresses
British television actresses
British expatriates in Mozambique